Anjanapalshi Dam is an earth-fill dam in India on the Anjana River near Kannad, in the Aurangabad district of Maharashtra. It was created as a means of irrigation.

Specifications

See also
 Dams in Maharashtra
 List of reservoirs and dams in India

References

Dams in Aurangabad district, Maharashtra
Dams completed in 1999
1999 establishments in Maharashtra